Elspeth Bruce Smith FRSE (1923 – 3 October 2017), née Dunkerley, was a British academic and biochemist.

Smith was educated at Cambridge, London and Aberdeen.

During World War II she was employed by the Ministry of Aircraft Production. Afterwards, she was a research assistant at Cambridge University and at St Bartholomew's Hospital.

In 1955 she was appointed Senior Lecturer at the Middlesex Hospital. In 1968 she became a lecturer at the University of Aberdeen and was subsequently a Reader, then Honorary Research Fellow in Clinical Biochemistry there.

She was elected a Fellow of the Royal Society of Edinburgh (FRSE).

References

External links 
 

1923 births
2017 deaths
Place of birth missing
Fellows of the Royal Society of Edinburgh
Alumni of the University of Cambridge
Middlesex Hospital
Academics of the University of Aberdeen
British biochemists